The 2012–13 Western Kentucky Hilltoppers men's basketball team represented Western Kentucky University during the 2012–13 NCAA Division I men's basketball season. The Hilltoppers were led by head coach Ray Harper which was his first full year after coaching the final 19 games in 2011–12. They played their home games at E. A. Diddle Arena and were members of the East Division of the Sun Belt Conference. They finished the season 20–16, 10–10 in Sun Belt play to finish in fourth place in the East Division. They were champions of the Sun Belt tournament, winning the championship game over FIU, to earn an automatic bid to the 2013 NCAA tournament where they lost in the second round to Kansas. T. J. Price and George Fant made the All-Conference Team; Fant and Brandon Harris were selected to the SBC Tournament Team, and Price was tournament MVP.

Roster

Schedule

|-
!colspan=9| Exhibition
 
 
|-
!colspan=9| Regular Season
 
 

|-
!colspan=9| 2013 Sun Belt Conference men's basketball tournament

|-
!colspan=9| 2013 NCAA tournament

References

Western Kentucky Hilltoppers basketball seasons
WKU
WKU